Blepharita amica is a moth of the family Noctuidae. It is found from northern Europe to the Russian plain, the Ural, Siberia (West Siberian Lowland and South Siberian Mountains), the Amur Oblast, Primorye Region and Kazakhstan. It has also been recorded from the Korean Peninsula, Japan (Hokkaido and Honshu) and north-eastern China.

The wingspan is 41–47 mm. Adults are on wing from the end of August to the beginning of October. Larvae have been recorded on Aconitum septentrionale, Heracleum sphondylium, Lactuca sativa, Pastinaca sativa, Taraxacum vulgare, Lupinus polyphyllus and Prunus padus.

External links
Swedish moths
Newly recorded species of Macrolepidoptera from Korea. (I) Seven species of Noctuidae, two of Lasiocampidae and one of Saturniidae
Insects of Korea
lepiforum.de

Cuculliinae
Moths of Asia
Moths of Europe
Moths described in 1825